The third season of Wilfred premiered on FX on June 20, 2013. The third season consisted of 13 episodes. The series is based on the original Australian series, Wilfred, and stars Elijah Wood, Jason Gann, Fiona Gubelmann and Dorian Brown.

Synopsis
As Ryan continues to experience Wilfred's various antics, new and confusing things start to be uncovered about a mysterious childhood drawing.

Cast

Main cast
 Elijah Wood as Ryan Newman
 Jason Gann as Wilfred
 Fiona Gubelmann as Jenna Mueller
 Dorian Brown as Kristen Newman

Special guest cast
 Mary Steenburgen as Catherine
 Dwight Yoakam as Bruce
 James Remar as Henry
 Kristen Schaal as Anne
 Angela Kinsey as Heather
 Gina Gershon as Gloria
 Barry Watson as Michael McDerry

Recurring cast
 Chris Klein as Drew
 Rodney To as Dr. Bangachon

Guest cast
 Jenny Mollen as Kim
 Lance Reddick as Dr. Blum
 Zachary Knighton as Bill
 George Coe as Gene
 Gerry Bednob as Mr. Patel
 Randee Heller as Margot

Episodes

Production
On October 31, 2012 Wilfred was renewed for a third season of 13 episodes. Reed Agnew and Eli Jorné took over as executive producers and day-to-day showrunners. Despite stepping down as showrunner, creator David Zuckerman stayed on as an executive producer. Filming began on March 11, 2013. This season premiered on June 20, 2013 with back-to-back episodes for two weeks, then returned to its regular half-hour slot on July 11 after the July 4 hiatus.

Notes

References

External links 

2013 American television seasons
Season 3